VF5 or VF5 may refer to:
 Virtua Fighter 5, a fighting game
 Vanadium(V) fluoride, a chemical compound
 Fighting Squadron 5 (VF-5), an aviation unit of the United States Navy